The following highways are numbered 723:

Costa Rica
 National Route 723

United States
Florida
  Florida State Road 723 (former)
Virginia
  Virginia State Route 723
Territories
  Puerto Rico Highway 723